The constituency of Smethwick in the West Midlands of England gained national media coverage at the 1964 general election, when Peter Griffiths of the Conservative Party gained the seat against the national trend, amidst controversy concerning racism.

Background
After the Second World War, Smethwick attracted a significant number of immigrants from Commonwealth countries, the largest ethnic group being Sikhs from the Punjab in India. There was also a background of factory closures, and a growing waiting list for local council housing. Griffiths ran a campaign critical of both the opposition, and the government's, immigration policies.

Labour activists claimed that supporters of the Conservative candidate had used the slogan "if you want a nigger for a neighbour, vote Labour", but Colin Jordan, leader of the neo-Nazi British Movement, claimed that his members had produced the initial slogan, as well as spread the poster and sticker campaign; Jordan's group in the past had also campaigned on other slogans, such as: "Don't vote – a vote for Tory, Labour or Liberal is a vote for more Blacks!". Griffiths denied that the slogan was racist, saying:

Election result
The 1964 general election had involved a nationwide swing from the Conservatives to the Labour Party, which had resulted in the latter party gaining a narrow five seat majority. However, in Smethwick, the Conservative candidate, Griffiths gained the seat and unseated the sitting Labour MP, Patrick Gordon Walker, who had served as Shadow Foreign Secretary for the eighteen months prior to the election. Griffiths did, however, poll 436 votes less in 1964 than when he stood unsuccessfully for the Smethwick constituency in 1959:

Figures nevertheless show that votes for Labour's Patrick Gordon Walker had been in decline from the 1950 general election onwards, culminating in this 1964 defeat by Peter Griffiths (see Smethwick (UK Parliament constituency) for details).

Aftermath
Following the election result, a British branch of the Ku Klux Klan was formed, and black and ethnic minority residents in the area had burning crosses put through their letterboxes. Peter Griffiths was declared "a parliamentary leper" by Harold Wilson, the new Labour Prime Minister. Griffiths, in his maiden speech to the Commons, pointed out what he believed were the real problems his constituency faced, including factory closures and over 4,000 families awaiting council accommodation. Patrick Gordon Walker subsequently lost the 1965 Leyton by-election, in a usually safe Labour seat, and the election result meant that Malcolm X would visit Smethwick to show solidarity with the black and minority ethnic communities in the area (in particular, the black and Asian community). Nine days after he visited Marshall Street in Smethwick, Malcolm X was shot dead in New York.

Labour regained the seat at the 1966 general election, when former actor Andrew Faulds became the new Member of Parliament.

Malcolm's visit to Smethwick was "no accident"; an official policy of racial segregation was attempted to be put into place in Smethwick's housing allocation, with houses on Marshall Street in Smethwick being let only to white British residents. In 1964, a delegation of white residents successfully petitioned the Conservative council to compulsorily buy vacant houses to prevent non-whites from buying the houses. This, however, was prevented by Labour housing minister Richard Crossman, who refused to allow the council to borrow the money in order to enact their policy.

The actions taken have been described as "ugly Tory racism" which "killed rational debate about immigration". However, colour bars were then common, preventing non-whites from using facilities. The Labour club in Smethwick operated one, as did the local Sandwell Youth Club, which was run by one of the town's Labour councillors.

See also
Racism in the UK Conservative Party

References

Further reading
 Rachel Yemm, "Immigration, race and local media: Smethwick and the 1964 general election", Contemporary British History, vol. 33, no. 1 (2019), pp. 98–122.

Elections in the West Midlands (county)
Smethwick
20th century in Staffordshire
Race relations in the United Kingdom
Constituency contests in UK General Elections
1964 United Kingdom general election